Zaghan-e Sofla (also Romanized as Zāghān-e Soflá; also known as Jākhan-e Pā’īn, Jākhan Pāin, and Zākhān-e Pā'īn) is a village in Agahan Rural District, Kolyai District, Sonqor County, Kermanshah Province, Iran. At the 2006 census, its population was 286, in 63 families.

References 

Populated places in Sonqor County